The 1986 Brown Bears football team was an American football team that represented Brown University during the 1986 NCAA Division I-AA football season. Brown finished fourth in the Ivy League. 

In their third season under head coach John Rosenberg, the Bears compiled a 5–4–1 record and outscored opponents 188 to 181. R. Collett, Jeff Garrison and Brian Murphy were the team captains. 

The Bears' 4–2–1 conference record placed third in the Ivy League standings. They outscored Ivy opponents 152 to 125. 

Brown played its home games at Brown Stadium in Providence, Rhode Island.

Schedule

References

Brown
Brown Bears football seasons
Brown Bears football